The year 1957 was the 176th year of the Rattanakosin Kingdom of Thailand. It was the 12th in the reign of King Bhumibol Adulyadej (Rama IX), and is reckoned as year 2500 in the Buddhist Era.

Incumbents
King: Bhumibol Adulyadej
Crown Prince: (vacant)
Prime Minister: 
 until 16 September: Plaek Phibunsongkhram 
16 - 21 September: National Revolutionize Council (junta)
 21 September - 26 December: Pote Sarasin
26 - 31 December: National Revolutionize Council (junta)
Supreme Patriarch: Vajirananavongs

Events

January
1 January - Lèse majesté in Thailand is strengthened to include "insult" and changed to a crime against national security, after the Thai criminal code of 1956 went into effect.

February

March

April

May

June

July
4 July - Queen Sirikit gives birth to a fourth child and third daughter Chulabhorn.

August

September

October

November

December

Births
4 July - Chulabhorn Thai Princess

Deaths

External links

References

 
Thailand
Years of the 20th century in Thailand
Thailand
1950s in Thailand